Miltochrista postnigra is a moth of the family Erebidae. It was described by George Hampson in 1894. It is found in Sikkim, India.

References

 

postnigra
Moths described in 1894
Moths of Asia